The Anukhva church is a ruined medieval church on the right bank of Psirtskha river at the village of Anukhva (Ankhua) in Gudauta District in Abkhazia, an entity in the South Caucasus with a disputed political status. It is located in the hills immediately south of the town of New Athos, at the Black Sea coastline.

History 
Only a pile of ruins survives of what appears to have been a hall church with a protruding apse and tiled roof. Several pieces of ornate masonry, some adorned with medieval inscriptions, have been retrieved from the site at various times and brought for safekeeping to a museum in Sukhumi. One artifact, a limestone slab of the altar screen measuring 78 x 73 x 10.5 cm, bears the image of an equestrian St. George slaying the prostrate emperor Diocletian—a recurrent scene in the medieval Georgian art—and is dated to the 10th-11th centuries. Another slab, measuring 76 х 78 cm, depicts the Crucifixion with the accompanying Greek and Georgian inscriptions. A part of the base of the limestone altar cross, measuring 28 x 100 x 20.5 cm, is decorated with an ornate cross and a Georgian inscription in the asomtavruli script, dated to the 11th century. It mentions the certain George, son of Basil (Giorgi Basilis-dze), and members of his household, who had installed the cross in the church. Other artifacts found at the site include an ornate column of the altar screen and a lead ring with the inscribed Georgian text addressing to "Saint George, of the Monastery of Anakhvi".

Notes

References 

Churches in Abkhazia
Georgian inscriptions